Linji Huguo Chan Temple is a Buddhist temple located in Zhongshan District of Taipei, Taiwan.

History
It was called Rinzai Gokokuzen-ji (臨済護国禅寺), which was a branch temple of Rinzai Zen Buddhism in Japanese rule period. Construction of the temple, designed by Japanese monk , commenced in 1900 and was completed in 1911. The statue of Sakyamuni was consecrated on June 21, 1912.

In April 2007, the Taipei Municipal Government has allocated NT$18.05 million for the reconstruction project.

Architecture
The extant buildings include the Shanmen, Four Heavenly Kings Hall, Mahavira Hall, bell tower, drum tower and a pagoda.

Mahavira Hall
The Mahavira Hall was built with double-eaves gable and hip roofs. It modeled the architectural style of the Song dynasty. On each of the main ridge is a tile named "Onigawara". The Mahavira Hall houses statues of Sakyamuni (center), Guanyin (right) and Ksitigarbha (left).

References

1911 establishments in Taiwan
20th-century Buddhist temples
Buddhist temples in Taipei
Religious buildings and structures completed in 1911